Pinnacle Marina Tower, formerly the Pinnacle Museum Tower, is a high rise at 550 Front Street in San Diego, California, United States. Located in the Marina district of Downtown San Diego, it's near Trolley Station.

See also
San Diego's tallest buildings

References

External links
Pinnacle Marina Tower Homeowners Association website

Buildings and structures completed in 2005
Residential skyscrapers in San Diego